The 2009 World Solar Challenge was one of a biennial series of solar-powered car races, covering  through the Australian Outback, from Darwin, Northern Territory to Adelaide, South Australia.

In the Challenge class 24 teams started, of which eight completed the course, and the winner was Tokai University of Japan. In the Adventure class seven teams started and two completed the course, the winner being Osaka Sangyo University also of Japan.

Challenge class

Adventure class

Note

References

 WSC 2009 results

External links
 WSC website

Solar car races
Scientific organisations based in Australia
Science competitions
Photovoltaics
Recurring sporting events established in 1987